Andrew Geoffrey Kaufman (January 17, 1949 – May 16, 1984) was an American entertainer and performance artist. While often called a "comedian", Kaufman preferred to describe himself instead as a "song and dance man". He has sometimes been called an "anti-comedian". He disdained telling jokes and engaging in comedy as it was traditionally understood, once saying in an interview, "I am not a comic, I have never told a joke. The comedian's promise is that he will go out there and make you laugh with him. My only promise is that I will try to entertain you as best I can."

After working in small comedy clubs in the early 1970s, Kaufman came to the attention of a wider audience in 1975, when he was invited to perform portions of his act on the first season of Saturday Night Live. His Foreign Man character was the basis of his performance as Latka Gravas on the hit television show Taxi from 1978 until 1983. During this time, he continued to tour comedy clubs and theaters in a series of unique performance art / comedy shows, sometimes appearing as himself and sometimes as obnoxiously rude lounge singer Tony Clifton. He was also a frequent guest on sketch comedy and late-night talk shows, particularly Late Night with David Letterman. In 1982, Kaufman brought his professional wrestling villain act to Letterman's show by way of a staged encounter with Jerry "The King" Lawler of the Continental Wrestling Association. The fact that the altercation was planned was not publicly disclosed for over a decade.

Kaufman died of lung cancer on May 16, 1984, at the age of 35. As pranks and elaborate ruses were major elements of his career, persistent rumors have circulated that Kaufman faked his own death as a grand hoax. He continues to be respected for the variety of his characters, his uniquely counterintuitive approach to comedy, and his willingness to provoke negative and confused reactions from audiences.

Early life
Kaufman was born on January 17, 1949, in New York City, the oldest of three children. He grew up with his younger brother Michael and sister Carol in a middle-class Jewish family in Great Neck, Long Island. His mother was Janice (née Bernstein), a homemaker and former fashion model, and his father was Stanley Kaufman, a jewelry salesman.  Kaufman began performing at children's birthday parties at age 9, playing records and showing cartoons. Kaufman spent much of his youth writing poetry and stories, including an unpublished novel, The Hollering Mangoo, which he completed at age 16. Following a visit to his school from Nigerian musician Babatunde Olatunji, Kaufman began playing the congas.

After graduating from Great Neck North High School in 1967, Kaufman took a year off before enrolling at the now defunct two-year Grahm Junior College in Boston, where he studied television production and starred in his own campus television show, Uncle Andy's Fun House. In August 1969, he hitchhiked to Las Vegas to meet Elvis Presley, showing up unannounced at the International Hotel. Soon after, he began performing at coffee houses and developing his act, as well as writing a one-man play, Gosh (later renamed God and published in 2000). After graduating in 1971, he began performing stand-up comedy at various small clubs on the East Coast.

Career

Foreign Man and Mighty Mouse
Kaufman first received major attention for his character Foreign Man, who spoke in a meek, high-pitched, heavily accented voice and claimed to be from "Caspiar", a fictional island in the Caspian Sea. It was as this character that Kaufman convinced the owner of the famed New York City comedy club The Improv, Budd Friedman, to allow him to perform on stage.

As Foreign Man, Kaufman would appear on the stage of comedy clubs, play a recording of the theme from the Mighty Mouse cartoon show while standing perfectly still, and lip-sync only the line "Here I come to save the day" with great enthusiasm. He proceeded to tell a few (intentionally poor) jokes and concluded his act with a series of celebrity impersonations, with the comedy arising from the character's obviously hopeless ineptitude at impersonation. For example, in his fake accent Kaufman announced to the audience, "I would like to imitate Meester Carter, de president of de United States" and then, in exactly the same voice, say "Hello, I am Meester Carter, de president of de United States. T'ank you veddy much."
At some point in the performance, usually when the audience was conditioned to Foreign Man's inability to perform a single convincing impression, Foreign Man would announce, "And now I would like to imitate the Elvis Presley", turn around, take off his jacket, slick his hair back, and launch into a rousing, hip-shaking rendition of Presley singing one of his hit songs. Like Presley, he took off his leather jacket during the song and threw it into the audience, but unlike Presley, Foreign Man would immediately ask for it to be returned. After the song's finale, he would take a simple bow and say in his Foreign Man voice, "T'ank you veddy much."

Portions of Kaufman's Foreign Man act were broadcast in the first season of Saturday Night Live. The Mighty Mouse number was featured in the October 11, 1975, premiere, while the joke-telling and celebrity impressions (including Elvis) were included in the November 8 broadcast that same year.

Latka

Kaufman first used his Foreign Man character in nightclubs in the early 1970s, often to tell jokes incorrectly and do weak imitations of famous people before bursting into his Elvis Presley imitation. The character was then changed into Latka Gravas for ABC's sitcom Taxi, appearing in 79 of 114 episodes in 1978–83. Bob Zmuda confirms this: "They basically were buying Andy's Foreign Man character for the Taxi character Latka." Kaufman's longtime manager George Shapiro encouraged him to take the gig.

Kaufman disliked sitcoms and was not happy with the idea of being in one, but Shapiro convinced him that it would quickly lead to stardom, which would earn him money he could then put into his own act. Kaufman agreed to appear in 14 episodes per season, and he initially wanted four for Kaufman's alter ego Tony Clifton. After Kaufman deliberately sabotaged Clifton's appearance on the show, however, that part of his contract was dropped.

His character was given multiple personality disorder, which allowed Kaufman to randomly portray other characters. In one episode of Taxi, Kaufman's character came down with a condition that made him act like Alex Rieger, the main character played by Judd Hirsch. Another such recurring character played by Kaufman was Latka's womanizing alter ego Vic Ferrari.

Sam Simon, who early in his career was a writer and later showrunner for Taxi, stated in a 2013 interview on Marc Maron's WTF podcast that the story of Kaufman having been generally disruptive on the show was "a complete fiction" largely created by Zmuda. Simon maintained that Zmuda has a vested interest in promoting an out-of-control image of Kaufman. In the interview Simon stated that Kaufman was "completely professional" and that he "told you Tony Clifton was him", but he also conceded that Kaufman would have "loved" Zmuda's version of events.

Kaufman was nominated for the Golden Globe Award for Best Supporting Actor in a Series, Limited Series, or Motion Picture Made for Television for Taxi in 1979 and 1981.

Tony Clifton

Another well-known Kaufman character is Tony Clifton, an absurd, audience-abusing lounge singer who began opening for Kaufman at comedy clubs and eventually even performed concerts on his own around the country. Sometimes it was Kaufman performing as Clifton, sometimes it was his brother Michael or Zmuda. For a brief time, it was unclear to some that Clifton was not a real person. News programs interviewed Clifton as Kaufman's opening act, with the mood turning ugly whenever Kaufman's name came up. Kaufman, Clifton insisted, was attempting to ruin Clifton's "good name" in order to make money and become famous.

As a requirement for Kaufman's accepting the offer to star on Taxi, he insisted that Clifton be hired for a guest role on the show as if he were a real person, not a character. After throwing a tantrum on the set, Clifton was fired and escorted from the studio lot by security guards. Much to Kaufman's delight, this incident was reported in the local newspapers.

Saturday Night Live Elvis skit incident

On the January 30, 1982, episode of Saturday Night Live, while impersonating Elvis Presley in a skit, Kaufman broke character by removing his wig and apologizing to the audience.

Kaufman explained this incident on the February 17, 1982 episode of Late Night with David Letterman. He said he apologized because he disagreed with the way Presley was portrayed in the skit, in which Presley instructs two young women from his performing audience to come backstage, then to strip until they are topless and wrestle each other in mud.

The skit was a reference to an incident alleged by a controversial 1981 biography of Presley by Albert Goldman. Critics of the biography noted the tone was particularly nasty or scornful toward Presley, and that the book seemed to be intended as an expose.

In his interview with Letterman, Kaufman said that he initially declined to perform the sketch, but was pressured into it. He then alleges that SNL staff threatened to ruin his reputation in the industry if he did not perform it.

After recounting this story, Kaufman said that Goldman threatened to sue Kaufman after the episode aired. Kaufman challenged Goldman to a public debate on Presley's character.

Carnegie Hall show
At the beginning of an April 1979 performance at New York's Carnegie Hall, Kaufman invited his "grandmother" to watch the show from a chair he had placed at the side of the stage. At the end of the show, she stood up, took her mask off and revealed to the audience that she was actually comedian Robin Williams.

Kaufman also had an elderly woman (Eleanor Cody Gould) pretend to have a heart attack and die on stage, at which point he reappeared on stage wearing a Native American headdress and performed a dance over her body, "reviving" her.

The performance is most famous for Kaufman's ending the show by taking the entire audience, in 24 buses, out for milk and cookies. He invited anyone interested to meet him on the Staten Island Ferry the next morning, where the show continued.

TV specials
The Taxi deal with ABC included giving Kaufman a television special/pilot. He came up with Andy's Funhouse, based on an old routine he had developed while in junior college. The special was taped in 1977 but did not air until August 1979. It featured most of Andy's famous gags, including Foreign Man/Latka and his Elvis Presley impersonation, as well as a host of unique segments (including a special appearance by children's television character Howdy Doody and the "Has-been Corner"). There was also a segment that included fake television screen static as part of the gag, which ABC executives were not comfortable with, fearing that viewers would mistake the static for broadcast problems and would change the channel—which was the comic element Kaufman wanted to present. Andy's Funhouse was written by Kaufman, Zmuda, and Mel Sherer, with music by Kaufman.

In March 1980, Kaufman filmed a short segment for an ABC show called Buckshot. The segment was just over six minutes long and was called Uncle Andy's Funhouse. It featured Kaufman as the host of a children's show for adults, complete with a peanut gallery and Tony Clifton puppet.

In 1983, a show very similar to Andy's Funhouse and Uncle Andy's Funhouse was filmed for PBS's SoundStage program, called The Andy Kaufman Show. It too featured a peanut gallery, and opened in the middle of an interview Kaufman is doing in which he is laughing hysterically. He then proceeds to thank the audience for watching and the credits roll.

Fridays incidents
In 1981, Kaufman made three appearances on Fridays, a variety show on ABC that was similar to Saturday Night Live. In the last sketch on his first appearance a decision was made to deliberately break the scene and improvise an upset to see what happened. The cast were briefed before the live scene began.

Kaufman broke character first, announcing that he "felt stupid", and refusing to say his lines. In response, cast member Michael Richards walked off camera and returned with a set of cue cards and dumped them on the table in front of Kaufman, who responded by splashing Richards with water. Co-producer Jack Burns stormed onto the stage, leading to a fake brawl on camera before the show cut to a commercial.

Michael Richards claimed that what was going to happen was known only to him, Burns, and Kaufman, but Melanie Chartoff, who played Kaufman's wife in the sketch, said that just before airtime Burns told her, Maryedith Burrell, and Richards that Kaufman was going to break the fourth wall.

Kaufman appeared the next week in a videotaped "apology" to the home viewers. Later that year, Kaufman returned to host Fridays. At one point in the show, he invited a Lawrence Welk Show gospel and standards singer, Kathie Sullivan, on stage to sing a few gospel songs with him and announced that the two were engaged to be married, then talked to the audience about his newfound faith in Jesus (Kaufman was Jewish). That was also a hoax. Later, following a sketch about a drug-abusing pharmacist, Kaufman was supposed to introduce the band The Pretenders. Instead of introducing the band, he delivered a nervous speech about the harmfulness of drugs, while the band stood behind him ready to play. After his speech, he informed the audience that he had talked for too long and had to go to a commercial.

Appearances
Although Kaufman made a name for himself as a guest on NBC's Saturday Night Live, his first prime-time appearances were several guest spots as the "Foreign Man" on the Dick Van Dyke variety show Van Dyke and Company in 1976. He appeared four times on The Tonight Show in 1976–78, and three times on The Midnight Special in 1972, 1977, and 1981. Kaufman appeared on The Dating Game in 1978, in character as Foreign Man, and cried when the bachelorette chose Bachelor #1, protesting that he had answered all the questions correctly.

His SNL appearances started with the first show, on October 11, 1975. He made 16 SNL appearances in all, doing routines from his comedy act, such as the Mighty Mouse singalong, Foreign Man, and the Elvis impersonation. After he angered the audience with his female-wrestling routine, Kaufman in January 1983 made a pretaped appearance (his 16th) asking the audience if he should ever appear on the show again, saying he would honor their decision. SNL ran a phone vote, and 195,544 people voted to "Dump Andy" while 169,186 people voted to "Keep Andy".

During the SNL episode with the phone poll, many of the cast members stated their admiration for Kaufman's work. After Eddie Murphy read both numbers, he said, "Now, Andy Kaufman is a friend of mine. Keep that in mind when you call. I don't want to have to punch nobody in America in the face", and Mary Gross read the Dump Andy phone number at a rate so fast that audiences were unable to catch it. The final tally was read by Gary Kroeger to a cheering audience. As the credits rolled, announcer Don Pardo said, "This is Don Pardo saying, 'I voted for Andy Kaufman.'"

Kaufman made a number of appearances on the daytime edition of The David Letterman Show in 1980, and 11 appearances on Late Night with David Letterman in 1982–83. He made numerous guest spots on other television programs hosted by or starring celebrities like Johnny Cash (1979 Christmas special), Dick Van Dyke, Dinah Shore, Rodney Dangerfield, Cher, Dean Martin, Redd Foxx, Mike Douglas, Dick Clark, and Joe Franklin.

He appeared in his first theatrical film, God Told Me To, in 1976, in which he portrayed a murderous policeman. He appeared in two other theatrical films, including the 1980 film In God We Tru$t, in which he played a televangelist, and the 1981 film Heartbeeps, in which he played a robot.

Laurie Anderson worked alongside Kaufman for a time in the 1970s, acting as a sort of "straight man" in a number of his Manhattan and Coney Island performances. One of these performances included getting on a ride that people stand in and get spun around. After everyone was strapped in, Kaufman would start saying how he did not want to be on the ride in a panicked tone and eventually cry. Anderson later described these performances in her 1995 album, The Ugly One with the Jewels.

In 1983, Kaufman appeared on Broadway with Deborah Harry in the play Teaneck Tanzi: The Venus Flytrap. It closed after just two performances.

Professional wrestling

Inspired by the theatricality of kayfabe, the staged nature of the sport, and his own tendency to form elaborate hoaxes, Kaufman began wrestling women during his act and proclaimed himself "Inter-Gender Wrestling Champion of the World", taking on an aggressive and ridiculous personality based on the characters invented by professional wrestlers. He offered a $1,000 prize to any woman who could pin him. He employed performance artist Laurie Anderson, a friend of his, in this act for a while.

Kaufman initially approached the head of the World Wrestling Federation (WWF) - now World Wrestling Entertainment or WWE - Vince McMahon Sr., about bringing his act to the New York wrestling territory. McMahon dismissed Kaufman's idea, as the elder McMahon was not about to bring "show business" into his Pro Wrestling society. Kaufman had by then developed a friendship with wrestling reporter/photographer Bill Apter. After many discussions about Kaufman's desire to be in the pro wrestling business, Apter called Memphis wrestling icon Jerry "The King" Lawler and introduced him to Kaufman by telephone.

Kaufman finally stepped into the ring (in the Memphis wrestling circuit) with a man—Lawler himself. Kaufman taunted the residents of Memphis by playing "videos showing residents how to use soap" and proclaiming the city to be "the nation's redneck capital". The ongoing Lawler-Kaufman feud, which often featured Jimmy Hart and other heels in Kaufman's corner, included a number of staged "works", such as a broken neck for Kaufman as a result of Lawler's piledriver and a famous on-air fight on a 1982 episode of Late Night with David Letterman.

For some time after that first match, Kaufman appeared wearing a neck brace, insisting that his injuries were much worse than they really were. Kaufman continued to defend the Inter-Gender Championship in the Mid-South Coliseum and offered an extra prize, other than the $1,000: that if he were pinned, the woman who pinned him would get to marry him and that Kaufman would also shave his head.

Eventually it was revealed that the feud and wrestling matches were staged works, and that Kaufman and Lawler were friends. This was not disclosed until more than 10 years after Kaufman's death, when the Emmy-nominated documentary A Comedy Salute to Andy Kaufman aired on NBC in 1995. Jim Carrey, who revealed the secret, later went on to play Kaufman in the 1999 film Man on the Moon. In a 1997 interview with the Memphis Flyer, Lawler said he had improvised during their first match and the Letterman incident.

Although officials at St. Francis Hospital stated that Kaufman's neck injuries were real, in his 2002 biography It's Good to Be the King ... Sometimes, Lawler detailed how they came up with the angle and kept it quiet. Even though Kaufman's injury was legitimate, the pair exaggerated it. He also said that Kaufman's furious tirade and performance on Letterman was Kaufman's own idea, including when Lawler slapped Kaufman out of his chair. Promoter Jerry Jarrett later recalled that for two years he mailed Kaufman payments comparable to what other main-event wrestlers were getting at the time, but Kaufman never deposited the cheques.

Kaufman appeared in the 1983 film My Breakfast with Blassie with professional wrestling personality "Classy" Freddie Blassie. The film was a parody of the art film My Dinner with Andre. Lynne Margulies, sister of the film's director, Johnny Legend, appears in it, and became romantically involved with Kaufman.

In 2002, Kaufman became a playable character in the video game Legends of Wrestling II and a standard character in 2004's Showdown: Legends of Wrestling. In 2008, Jakks Pacific produced for their WWE Classic Superstars toy line an action figure two-pack of Kaufman and Lawler, as well as a separate figure release with a royal blue robe.

Personal life
Kaufman never married. His daughter, Maria Bellu-Colonna (born 1969), was the child of an out-of-wedlock relationship with a high-school girlfriend and was placed for adoption. Bellu-Colonna learned in 1992 that she was Kaufman's daughter when she traced her biological roots by winning a petition of the State of New York for her biological mother's surname. She soon reunited with her mother, grandfather, uncle, and aunt. Bellu-Colonna's daughter, Brittany, briefly appeared in Man on the Moon, playing Kaufman's sister Carol as a young child.

In December 1969, Kaufman learned Transcendental Meditation at college. According to a BBC article, he used the technique "to build confidence and take his act to comedy clubs". For the rest of his life, Kaufman meditated and performed yoga three hours a day. From February to June 1971, he trained as a teacher of transcendental meditation in Mallorca, Spain.

Lynne Margulies, who met Kaufman during the filming of My Breakfast with Blassie, was in a relationship with Kaufman from 1982 until his death in 1984. Margulies later co-directed the 1989 Kaufman wrestling compilation I'm from Hollywood, and published the 2009 book Dear Andy Kaufman, I Hate Your Guts!.

Kaufman kept his personal life secret and instead engaged in pranks and stunts to make it more obscure, such as claiming to adopt three sons in a September 22, 1983 appearance on David Letterman's show.

Illness and death

At Thanksgiving dinner on Long Island in November 1983, several family members openly expressed worry about Kaufman's persistent coughing. He claimed that he had been coughing for nearly a month, visited his doctor, and was told that nothing was wrong. When he returned to Los Angeles, he consulted another physician, and then checked himself into Cedars-Sinai Medical Center for a series of medical tests. A few days later, he was diagnosed with large-cell carcinoma of the lung, typically associated with smoking.

After audiences were shocked by his gaunt appearance during January 1984 performances, Kaufman acknowledged that he had an unspecified illness that he hoped to cure with natural medicine, including a diet of all fruits and vegetables, among other measures. Kaufman received palliative radiotherapy, but by then the cancer had spread from his lungs to his brain. His final public appearance was at the premiere of My Breakfast With Blassie in March 1984, where he appeared thin and sported a mohawk (radiation treatments made his hair fall out).

The next day, Kaufman and Lynne Margulies flew to Baguio, Philippines, where, as a last resort, he received treatments of a pseudoscientific procedure called psychic surgery (now recognized as explicitly deceptive medical fraud).

Afterward, Kaufman initially said he felt better and returned to the U.S., but he died at Cedars-Sinai Medical Center in Los Angeles on May 16, 1984, at the age of 35.

Death-hoax rumors

Kaufman often spoke of faking his own death as a grand hoax, with rumors persisting, often fueled by sporadic appearances of Kaufman's character Tony Clifton at comedy clubs after his death. Kaufman's official website describes the faked death story as an "urban legend" and includes a picture of his death certificate.

"Clifton" performed a year after Kaufman's death at The Comedy Store benefit in Kaufman's honor, with members of his entourage in attendance, and during the 1990s made several appearances at Los Angeles nightclubs. Jim Carrey, who portrayed Kaufman in Man on the Moon, stated on the NBC special Comedy Salute to Andy Kaufman that the person doing the Clifton character was Bob Zmuda.

In 2013, responding to rumors following the appearance of an actress who claimed to be Kaufman's daughter and that he was still alive, Los Angeles County Coroner's office re-released Kaufman's death certificate to confirm he was indeed deceased and buried at Beth David Cemetery.

In 2014, Zmuda and Lynne Margulies, Kaufman's girlfriend at the time of his death, coauthored Andy Kaufman: The Truth, Finally, a book claiming that Kaufman's death was indeed a prank, and that he would soon be revealing himself, as his upper limit on the "prank" was 30 years. He did not reappear.

Legacy and tributes
Comedian Elayne Boosler, who dated and lived with Kaufman and credits him with encouraging her to do comedy, wrote an article for Esquire in November 1984, in his memory. She also dedicated her 1986 Showtime special Party of One to Kaufman. An audio recording of Kaufman offering encouragement to Boosler is featured in the intro.

In 1992, the band R.E.M. released the song "Man on the Moon", a tribute to Kaufman. The song's video also featured footage of Kaufman. On March 29, 1995, NBC aired A Comedy Salute To Andy Kaufman. This special featured clips of many of Kaufman's performances, as well as commentary from some of his friends, family, and colleagues.

Comedian Richard Lewis in A Comedy Salute to Andy Kaufman said of him: "No one has ever done what Andy did, and did it as well, and no one will ever. Because he did it first. So did Buster Keaton, so did Andy." Carl Reiner recalled his distinction in the comedy world: Did Andy influence comedy? No. Because nobody's doing what he did. Jim Carrey was influenced—not to do what Andy did, but to follow his own drummer. I think Andy did that for a lot of people. Follow your own drumbeat. You didn't have to go up there and say 'take my wife, please.' You could do anything that struck you as entertaining. It gave people freedom to be themselves.Reiner also said of Kaufman: "Nobody can see past the edges, where the character begins and he ends."

Jim Carrey portrayed Kaufman in the 1999 biopic film Man on the Moon, directed by Miloš Forman; the film took its title from the band R.E.M.'s song of the same name. R.E.M. also did the score for the film and recorded another Kaufman tribute song, "The Great Beyond". Carrey's portrayal was met with critical acclaim, earning him a Golden Globe Award for his performance. Forman named his twin sons, born in 1998, Andrew and James, after Kaufman and Carrey. In July 2012, Kaufman's play Bohemia West was staged in Providence, Rhode Island. Comedian Vernon Chatman compiled and produced Kaufman's first album, Andy and His Grandmother—via Drag City in 2013.

Andy Kaufman is one of the featured celebrities in the 2005 children's book Different Like Me: My Book of Autism Heroes. Actress Cindy Williams, who was good friends with Kaufman, devoted an entire chapter of her autobiography, Shirley, I Jest!: A Storied Life, to him. The Chris Gethard Show paid homage to the Kaufman Fridays incident in a goof on an episode with comedian Brett Davis throwing water on someone's face.

At The Comedy Store comedy club in Los Angeles there is a neon likeness of Kaufman on display. The club also features on their menu the "Andy Kaufman Special", which consists of "two cookies and a glass of ice cold milk". The Vic Ferrari Band took its name from Kaufman's Taxi character. According to executive producer Bill Oakley, the 1996 The Simpsons episode "Bart the Fink", in which Krusty the Clown fakes his death, was partially inspired by the rumors of Kaufman's faked death.

Al Jean, co-creator of the animated series The Critic, has stated that the first season drawing of Jon Lovitz's character Jay Sherman was loosely based on Kaufman.

For the 2015 Andy Kaufman Award show, Two Boots Pizza created a special Andy Kaufman pie. As of 2018, they still feature a Tony Clifton pie on their menu. In 2015, a bottled fragrance called "Andy Kaufman Milk & Cookies" was created.

German filmmaker Maren Ade stated that her 2016 film Toni Erdmann, which was nominated for the Palme d'Or at the Cannes Film Festival, was partially inspired by Kaufman and Tony Clifton.

Since 2004, The Andy Kaufman Award competition has been held annually as "a showcase for promising cutting-edge artists with fresh and unconventional material, for those willing to take risks with an audience, and for those who do not define themselves by the typical conventions of comedy".

On June 20, 2019, it was announced that Kaufman was to be honored with a posthumous star on the Hollywood Walk of Fame in the television category. He was part of the Class of 2020.

The Russian band Korol' i Shut recorded the song "Endi Kaufman" on its album Teatr Demona.

Filmography

Television

Film

Home media

Discography

Bibliography
Three books of Kaufman's writings have been posthumously published:
, a novel
, the script for a one-man play Kaufman did in college
, a collection of his adolescent writings

See also
 List of Jewish professional wrestlers

References

Further reading
 Zehme, Bill (1999), Lost in the Funhouse: The Life and Mind of Andy Kaufman, Delacorte Press. 
 Zmuda, Bob; Hansen, Matthew Scott (1999), Andy Kaufman Revealed!: Best Friend Tells All, Back Bay Books. 
 Hecht, Julie (2001), Was This Man a Genius? Talks with Andy Kaufman, Vintage Books. 
 Keller, Florian (2005), Andy Kaufman: Wrestling with the American Dream, University Of Minnesota Press. 
 Zoglin, Richard (2008), Comedy at the Edge: How Stand-up in the 1970s Changed America, Bloomsbury USA. 
 Margulies, Lynne; Zmuda, Bob (2009), Dear Andy Kaufman, I Hate Your Guts!, Process. 
 Knoedelseder, William (2009), I'm Dying Up Here: Heartbreak and High Times in Stand-Up Comedy's Golden Era, PublicAffairs. 
 Margulies, Lynne; Zmuda, Bob (2014), Andy Kaufman, The Truth Finally, BenBella Books.

External links

 
 
 The New Yorker, November 22, 1999 Issue. “Was This Man a Genius? A Year with Andy Kaufman, the Consummate Straight Man.” by Julie Hecht
 The Village Voice, November 9, 1999 Issue. “Waking Andy Kaufman.” by Bill Jensen
Dave Hirshey, “Andy Kaufman: Beyond Laughter“; Rolling Stone, April 30, 1981.
 

 
1949 births
1984 deaths
20th-century American comedians
20th-century American male actors
Male actors from New York City
American male comedians
American male film actors
American male television actors
American performance artists
American male professional wrestlers
Jewish professional wrestlers
Death conspiracy theories
Deaths from lung cancer in California
Elvis impersonators
Jewish American male actors
People from Long Island
Professional wrestlers from New York (state)
The First Family (professional wrestling) members
American sketch comedians
Burials at Beth David Cemetery
Comedians from New York City
Great Neck North High School alumni
Jewish American male comedians
Jewish singers
Professional wrestlers from New York City
Singers from New York City